Elliot Jones is an American baseball coach and former first baseman, who is the current head baseball coach of the Alabama A&M Bulldogs. He played college baseball at Southern for coach Roger Cador from 2012 to 2014.

Playing career
Originally from Shreveport, Louisiana, Jones attended Huntington High School in Shreveport. While there, he was a two-sport athlete, quarterbacking the football team as well as playing baseball. On March 31, 2011, Jones committed to play college baseball at Southern University.

Coaching career
Jones began his coaching career as an assistant at Southern. He was originally hired to be the head coach at Livonia High School, but he decided to accept a position as an assistant at Grambling State University instead.

On October 23, 2020, Jones was named the head coach of Alabama A&M.

Head coaching record

References

External links

Southern Jaguars baseball players
Southern Jaguars baseball coaches
Grambling State Tigers baseball coaches
Alabama A&M Bulldogs baseball coaches
Baseball players from Louisiana
Baseball first basemen
Year of birth missing (living people)
Living people
African-American baseball coaches
Baseball coaches from Louisiana
Sportspeople from Shreveport, Louisiana